Geldrop is a town in the Dutch province of North Brabant. It is in the municipality of Geldrop-Mierlo, around 5 km east of Eindhoven city centre.

Geldrop was a separate municipality until 2004, when it merged with Mierlo.

Geldrop is noted for having a neighbourhood with streets named after characters and elements from the works of J. R. R. Tolkien.

The spoken language is "Geldrops", a distinct dialect within the East Brabantian dialect group and very similar to colloquial Dutch.

Transport
The A67 motorway (part of European route E34) links Geldrop with Eindhoven.

Geldrop railway station is on the Eindhoven–Weert line.

Archaeology in Geldrop
Geldrop has proven a fertile ground for archaeological digs, with finds from various historical and prehistorical eras.

The exact age of Geldrop isn't known. Through the years, several archaeological finds were made which testify to prehistoric occupants.

Where over 10.000 years ago reindeer hunters of the so-called Ahrensburg culture placed their tents, the finds on the Geldrops grounds included, among other things, two toes with engraving. On one of them a reindeer horn was represented, on the other one a dancing little girl who got nicknamed "The Venus of Mierlo".

Finds in the south of Zesgehuchten (a district of Geldrop) indicate small settlements from the New Stone Age (about 3000 BC).

Finds from the Roman Period and the early Middle Ages have been found off Genoenhuis and Hoog Geldrop (districts in Geldrop). In the autumn of 1989, archaeological diggings at the nearby 't Zand Cemetery found four settlements from the late Roman Period and the Middle Ages: a period which covers the years between 350 and 1225 AD.

Gallery

Famous people from Geldrop

 Dries van Agt (born 1931), former prime minister
 Ernest Faber (born 1971), footballer for PSV and the Netherlands national football team
 A. F. Th. van der Heijden (born 1951), writer
 Jeffrey Herlings (born 1994), motocross world champion
 Pieter van den Hoogenband (born 1978), swimmer, Winner Olympic Gold
 Viktor Horsting (born 1969), fashion designer
 Guido Imbens (born 1963), Economist, Winner of the Nobel Memorial Prize in Economic Sciences
 Roos van Montfort (born 1989), Playboy model
 Lara Stone (born 1983), model
 Art Rooijakkers (born 1976), television presenter
 Kelly van Santvoort (born 1992), communicator

References

External links

Website Geldrop
Website Geldrop Centrum (Dutch)

Municipalities of the Netherlands disestablished in 2004
Former municipalities of North Brabant
Populated places in North Brabant
Geldrop-Mierlo